Harro Bode (born 20 February 1951, in Sobernheim) is a German sailor and Olympic champion. He won a gold medal in the 470 Class with Frank Hübner at the 1976 Summer Olympics in Montreal.

He was appointed honorary professor at the University of Hanover and published many papers about water science and water politics.

Honours
 1976: Award of silver laurel leaf by German Bundespräsident Walter Scheel
 1987: Karl-Imhoff-Prize of the German Association for Water, Wastewater and Waste (DWA) (formerly ATV)
 2014: IWA-Award for "Outstanding Contribution to Water Management and Science"
 2015: Golden Badge of Honor of the German Association for Water, Wastewater and Waste (DWA)

References

External links
 
 
 
 Literature from and about Harro Bode in the catalogue of the German national library
 Ruhrverband

1951 births
Living people
German male sailors (sport)
Olympic sailors of West Germany
Olympic gold medalists for West Germany
Olympic medalists in sailing
Sailors at the 1976 Summer Olympics – 470
Medalists at the 1976 Summer Olympics